In quantum mechanics and statistical mechanics, parastatistics is one of several alternatives to the better known particle statistics models (Bose–Einstein statistics, Fermi–Dirac statistics and Maxwell–Boltzmann statistics).  Other alternatives include anyonic statistics and braid statistics, both of these involving lower spacetime dimensions. Herbert S. Green is credited with the creation of parastatistics in 1953.

Formalism
Consider the operator algebra of a system of N identical particles. This is a *-algebra. There is an SN group (symmetric group of order N)  acting upon the operator algebra with the intended interpretation of permuting the N particles. Quantum mechanics requires focus on observables having a physical meaning, and the observables would have to be invariant under all possible permutations of the N particles. For example, in the case N = 2, R2 − R1 cannot be an observable because it changes sign if we switch the two particles, but the distance between the two particles : |R2 − R1| is a legitimate observable.

In other words, the observable algebra would have to be a *-subalgebra invariant under the action of SN (noting that this does not mean that every element of the operator algebra invariant under SN is an observable). This allows different superselection sectors, each parameterized by a Young diagram of SN.

In particular:

 For N identical parabosons of order p (where p is a positive integer), permissible Young diagrams are all those with p or fewer rows.
 For N identical parafermions of order p, permissible Young diagrams are all those with p or fewer columns.
 If p is 1, this reduces to Bose–Einstein and Fermi–Dirac statistics respectively.
 If p is arbitrarily large (infinite), this reduces to Maxwell–Boltzmann statistics.

Quantum field theory
A paraboson field of order p,  where if x and y are spacelike-separated points,  and  if  where [,] is the commutator and {,} is the anticommutator. Note that this disagrees with the spin-statistics theorem, which is for bosons and not parabosons. There might be a group such as the symmetric group Sp acting upon the φ(i)s. Observables would have to be operators which are invariant under the group in question. However, the existence of such a symmetry is not essential.

A parafermion field  of order p, where if x and y are spacelike-separated points,  and  if . The same comment about observables would apply together with the requirement that they have even grading under the grading where the ψs have odd grading.

The parafermionic and parabosonic algebras are generated by elements that obey the commutation and anticommutation relations. They generalize the usual fermionic algebra and the bosonic algebra of quantum mechanics. The Dirac algebra and the Duffin–Kemmer–Petiau algebra appear as special cases of the parafermionic algebra for order p = 1 and p = 2, respectively.

Explanation 
Note that if x and y are spacelike-separated points, φ(x) and φ(y) neither commute nor anticommute unless p=1. The same comment applies to ψ(x) and ψ(y). So, if we have n spacelike separated points x1, ..., xn,

corresponds to creating n identical parabosons at x1,..., xn. Similarly,

corresponds to creating n identical parafermions. Because these fields neither commute nor anticommute

and

gives distinct states for each permutation π in Sn.

We can define a permutation operator  by

and

respectively. It is also unitary. Moreover,  is an operator-valued representation of the symmetric group Sn and as such, we can interpret it as the action of Sn upon the n-particle Hilbert space itself, turning it into a unitary representation.

QCD can be reformulated using parastatistics with the quarks being parafermions of order 3 and the gluons being parabosons of order 8. Note this is different from the conventional approach where quarks always obey anticommutation relations and gluons commutation relations.

See also
Klein transformation on how to convert between parastatistics and the more conventional statistics.

References

 
Permutations